The 1989–90 Turkish Cup was the 28th edition of the annual tournament that determined the association football Süper Lig Turkish Cup  champion under the auspices of the Turkish Football Federation (TFF). Beşiktaş successfully contested Trabzonspor 2–0 in the final.

References

1989-90
Cup
Turkey